

Belgium
 Congo Free State 
 Théophile Wahis, Governor-General of the Congo Free State (1892–1908)
 Émile Wangermée, acting Governor-General of the Congo Free State (1896–1900)

France
 French Indochina – Paul Doumer, Governor-General of French Indochina (1897–1902)
 French Somaliland – Léonce Lagarde, Governor of French Somaliland (1888–1899)
 Guinea –
 Noël-Eugène Ballay, Lieutenant-Governor of Guinea (1896–1898)
 Paul Jean François Cousturier, Lieutenant-Governor of Guinea (1898–1900)

Germany
 German East Africa – Eduard von Liebert, Governor of German East Africa (1896–1901)

Japan
 Taiwan –
Nogi Maresuke, Governor-General of Taiwan (14 October 1896 – January 1898)
Kodama Gentarō, Governor-General of Taiwan (26 February 1898 – April 1906)

Portugal
 Portuguese Angola – António Duarte Ramada Curto, Governor-General of Angola (1897–1900)
 Portuguese Cape Verde – João Cesário de Lacerda, Governor of The Islands of Cape Verde (1898–1900)
 Portuguese Macau – Eduardo Augusto Rodrigues Galhardo, Governor of Macau (1897–1900)
 Portuguese Mozambique –
 Baltasar Friere Cabral, acting Governor-General of Mozambique (1897–1898)
 Carlos Alberto Schultz Xavier, Governor-General of Mozambique (1898)
 Álvaro António Ferreira, Governor-General of Mozambique (1898–1900)
 Portuguese Guinea –
 Álvaro Herculano da Cunha, acting Governor of Portuguese Guinea (1897–1898)
 Albano Mendes de Magalhães Ramalho, Governor of Portuguese Guinea (1898–1899)
 Portuguese India – Joaquim José Machado, Governor of Portuguese India (1897–1900)
 Portuguese Timor – José Celestino da Silva, Governor of Portuguese Timor (1896–1908)
 Portuguese São Tomé and Príncipe – Amâncio de Alpoim Cerqueira Borges Cabral, Governor of São Tomé and Príncipe (1899–1901)

United Kingdom
 Cape Colony –
 Alfred Milner, Governor of Cape Colony (1897–1901)
 Sir William Francis Butler acting Governor of Cape Colony (1898–1899)
 Colony of Natal – Sir Walter Hely-Hutchinson (1893–1901)
 Gold Coast – Frederick Mitchell Hodgson, Governor of the Gold Coast (1897–1900)
 East Africa Protectorate – Sir Arthur Henry Hardinge, Commissioner of East Africa (1895–1900)
 Malta Colony – Arthur Fremantle, Governor of Malta (1893–1899)
 New South Wales – Viscount Hampden, Governor of New South Wales (1895–1899)
 North-Eastern Rhodesia
 Henry Lawrence Daly, acting Administrator of North-Eastern Rhodesia (1897–1898)
 Robert Edward Codrington, Administrator of North-Eastern Rhodesia (1898–1907)
 North-Western Rhodesia – Robert Thorne Coryndon, Administrator of North-Western Rhodesia (1897–1907)
 Queensland – Charles Cochrane-Baillie, Governor of Queensland (1896 – 31 December 1900 then State Governor on Australia's Federation to 1901)
 Royal Niger Company – Sir George Taubman Goldie, Governor of the Royal Niger Company (1895–1900)
 Tasmania – Jenico Preston, Lord Gormanston, Governor of Tasmania (1893–1900)
 South Australia – Sir Thomas Buxton, Governor of South Australia (1895–1899)
 Victoria – Thomas, Earl Brassey, Governor of Victoria (1895–1900)
 Western Australia – Lieutenant-Colonel Gerard Smith, Governor of Western Australia (1895–1900)

Colonial governors
Colonial governors
1898